Guns, God and Government is the third live video album by American rock band Marilyn Manson, released on October 29, 2002 on the formats VHS, DVD and UMD, documenting the tour of the same name. The DVD contains live performances that switch between visuals of various shows from United States, Japan, Russia and Europe while maintaining a single consistent music track.

On November 16, 2009, the live performance of the October 8, 2001 concert in Los Angeles was released in Blu-ray format.  The re-release documents the concert in full instead of a montage of live performances as previously released in the 2002 DVD version. "The Death Song" was removed from this edition since it wasn't shown on the pay-per-view telecast when originally premiered.

Both releases contain additional content in the form of a short film titled "The Death Parade" that was mixed by Rogers Masson and Marilyn Manson. It features a backstage look at the band's tour including cameos from such artists as Ozzy Osbourne, Joey Jordison and Eminem.

Release

Track listing 
 "Intro" / "Count to Six and Die" – 2:16
 "Irresponsible Hate Anthem" – 3:46
 "The Reflecting God" – 5:34
 "Great Big White World" – 5:02
 "Disposable Teens" – 3:56
 "The Fight Song" – 4:19
 "The Nobodies" – 3:56
 "Rock Is Dead" – 3:13
 "The Dope Show" – 4:14
 "Cruci-Fiction in Space" – 5:02
 "Sweet Dreams" / "Hell Outro" – 6:14
 "The Love Song" – 3:13
 "The Death Song" – 3:28 (DVD only)
 "Antichrist Superstar" – 4:20
 "The Beautiful People" – 5:05
 "Astonishing Panorama of the Endtimes" – 4:08
 "Lunchbox" – 9:02
 "Outro" – 2:16 (unlisted)
 "The Death Parade" – 29:53

Technical specifications

DVD 
DVD-9 Dual Layer
4:3 screen format
Audio: DTS Digital Surround Sound, Dolby Surround 5.1, Dolby Digital Stereo

Blu-ray 
Video codec: MPEG-4 AVC
Video resolution: 1080i
Aspect ratio: 1.78:1 (16x9)
Audio: DTS-HD Master Audio 5.1, Dolby Digital 5.1, LPCM 2.0

Certifications

Personnel 
 Marilyn Manson — vocals
 John 5 — guitars
 Madonna Wayne Gacy — keyboards
 Ginger Fish — drums
 Twiggy Ramirez — bass

References

External links 
 

2002 video albums
Live video albums
Marilyn Manson (band) video albums
Nothing Records video albums